Aeolian Investment Fund S.A. is a Greek company which is listed on the Athens Stock Exchange and invests in other Greek companies.

The company was founded in 1992, has been listed on the Athens Stock Exchange since 1993 and is based in Athens, Greece.

External links
 Aeolian Investment Fund

Companies listed on the Athens Exchange